Yefrem Yevseyevich Sokolov (25 April 1926 – 5 April 2022) was a Belarusian politician, who served as a first secretary of the Communist Party of Byelorussian SSR from February 1987 to November 1990. Sokolov was a member of the 28th Politburo, elected on 14 July 1990 by the 1st Plenary Session of the 28th Central Committee.

Biography
He was born into a Belarusian peasant family. From 1944 to the end of the decade he served in the Soviet Army, then worked as a driver on a farm of the Belarusian State Agricultural Academy, where he graduated from in 1956. It was here where he joined the CPSU and in 1961, he graduated from the Higher Party School in Moscow. In 1969, he became part of the apparatus of the Central Committee and was in 1977 appointed party chief for Brest. From 6 February 1987 to 30 November 1990, he was First Secretary of the Central Committee of the Communist Party of Belarus, being the last one to serve as the de facto head of the Byelorussian SSR.

From 1989–1991, he was a member of the Supreme Soviet of the USSR. Since 1990, he had been a pensioner and continued political activities such as heading the Council of the Communist Party of Belarus. Sokolov's death was announced on 5 April 2022, at the age of 95.

References

1926 births
2022 deaths
People from Horki District
Communist Party of the Soviet Union members
Central Committee of the Communist Party of the Soviet Union candidate members
Central Committee of the Communist Party of the Soviet Union members
Politburo of the Central Committee of the Communist Party of the Soviet Union members
Presidium of the Supreme Soviet
Tenth convocation members of the Supreme Soviet of the Soviet Union
Eleventh convocation members of the Supreme Soviet of the Soviet Union
Tenth convocation members of the Soviet of Nationalities
Eleventh convocation members of the Soviet of Nationalities
Members of the Congress of People's Deputies of the Soviet Union
Heads of the Communist Party of Byelorussia
Communist Party of Byelorussia politicians
Members of the Supreme Soviet of the Byelorussian Soviet Socialist Republic
Heroes of Socialist Labour
Recipients of the Order of Lenin
Recipients of the Order of the Red Banner of Labour